Eleanor Percy may refer to:
 Eleanor Percy, Duchess of Buckingham (c. 1474–1530)
 Eleanor Percy, Duchess of Northumberland (1820–1911)